

The Nigerian Civil War 
In 1967,  a Civil war broke out in Nigeria, the war was between the Nigerian troops and Biafran troops. The head of state as at that time was Gen Yakubu Gowon and the Biafran troop where lead by Col Chukuemeka Ojukwu. The war lasted for three years, beginning from  6 Jul 1967 to 15 Jan 1970. Gowon had just been chosen as the Head of State after a coup d'état on January 15, 1966, which left the first Military Head of State Major General  Johnson Ironsi assassinated.

There was widespread chaos and tumult, lots of  people from Eastern Region of Nigeria predominantly of Igbo descent were  targeted and attacked in Northern Nigeria so they fled. Ojukwu reassures the people and encouraged them to go back to  their business in other parts of the country.

To mitigate all this occurrences  and keep the peace, the federal military government chose delegates to meet with those of the eastern region met at Aburi, a Ghanaian town, where the popular Aburi Accord was signed.

The  Decree No. 8, which was passed which was mainly an embodiment of the accord but shortly after that to what seemed like a contradiction, General Gowon  announced the creation of 12 states  on May 27, 1967, breaking the Eastern State.

This was the major reason for the secession by Ojukwu subsequently a declaration of independence.

A new legal tender was introduced and the old one withdrawn, new Nigerian pound.

The Creation of States 

General Yakubu Gowon created twelve states out of the four regions that existed at that time appointing a governor to head them. This move was  seen by Col Chukwuemeka Ojukwu as a ploy to weaken the Eastern Region and a breach of the Aburi Accord.

The following were the governors:
 Bendel State: Colonel Samuel Ogbemudia
 Benue-Plateau State: Police Commissoner Joseph Gomwalk
 Cross River State: Colonel Udoakaha Jacob Esuene
 East Central State: Colonel Chukwuemeka Ojukwu
 [North Central State: Brigadier Abba Kyari
 Kano State: Colonel Sanni Bello
 Kwara State: Colonel Ibrahim Taiwo
 Lagos State: Colonel Mobolaji Olufunso Johnson
 Northeastern State: Colonel Musa Usman
 Northwestern State: Police Commissioner Usman Faruk
 Rivers State: Lieutenant Commander Papayere Diette-Spiff
 Western State: Colonel Robert Adeyinka Adebayo

The Nigerian Defence Academy 
The Nigerian Defence Academy graduated their first set which included graduating cadets of the NDA Regular 1 Course in March 1967.

Members of the Supreme Military Council 
NAF (Kurubo) Ejoor (COS Army), Wey (COS SHQ), GOWON, Kam Saleem (IG), Soroh (Navy), Rotimi (West), GbamiboyeCW/Kwara), Asika (EC).

Incumbents

Federal government 
 Head of State: Yakubu Gowon
 Deputy Head of State: Joseph Edet Akinwale Wey
  Commissioner of Defence: Yakubu Gowon
 Chief of Army Staff: Joseph Akahan
 Chief Justice: Sir Adetokunbo Ademola

Events
 6 July - 14 July - Battle of Nsukka,  the first military conflict during the Nigerian Civil War.
 19 September - Republic of Benin established
 20 September - Republic of Benin disestablished 	
 7 October - Asaba massacre took place when federal troops of Nigeria entered Asaba, rounded up as many as 500 Igbo men of Asaba and shot them.
 17 October - Start of Operation Tiger Claw

Births
27 April - Iyabo Obasanjo-Bello, politician
8 September - Yvonne Losos de Muñiz, dressage rider
16 October - Ike Shorunmu, footballer
date unknown - Helon Habila, novelist and poet

Deaths
September - Christopher Okigbo, poet, 37, killed during Nigerian Civil War

References

 
Years of the 20th century in Nigeria
Nigeria
Nigeria
1960s in Nigeria